Casper Wilfried Viviers (born 1 June 1988) is a rugby union player for the Namibia national team and the  in the Currie Cup and the Rugby Challenge. He was named in Namibia's squad for the 2015 Rugby World Cup.

References

1988 births
Living people
Namibia international rugby union players
Namibian rugby union players
Rugby union players from Windhoek
White Namibian people
Rugby union props